Caproni, also known as Società de Agostini e Caproni and Società Caproni e Comitti, was an Italian aircraft manufacturer. Its main base of operations was at Taliedo, near Linate Airport, on the outskirts of Milan.

Founded by Giovanni Battista "Gianni" Caproni during 1908, the company produced several successful heavy bombers during the First World War. Following the acquisition of several other aviation firms throughout the interwar period, Caproni transformed into a sizable aviation-orientated syndicate, the Società Italiana Caproni, Milano. The majority of its aircraft were bombers and transport aircraft. It played a pioneering role in the development of the Caproni Campini N.1, an experimental aircraft powered by a thermo-jet. It provided large numbers of combat aircraft for the Axis during the Second World War. The firm did not prosper in the postwar era, the Società Italiana Caproni collapsing during 1950. Many of the company's former assets were subsequently acquired by the Italian helicopter specialist Agusta.

History
The company was founded during 1908 by the Italian aviation pioneer and aeronautical engineer Giovanni Battista "Gianni" Caproni. It was initially named, from 1911, Società de Agostini e Caproni, then Società Caproni e Comitti. Caproni was responsible for completing the first aircraft of Italian construction in 1911. Its principal manufacturing facilities were based in Taliedo, a peripheral district of Milan, close to Linate Airport, while the firm's Caproni Vizzola division was based in Vizzola Ticino, close to Milan–Malpensa Airport.

The firm initially produced a series of small single-engine aircraft, including the Caproni Ca.1, Ca.6 and Ca.12; these became important milestones in the early development of Italian aviation. As such, Caproni became one of the most important Allied aircraft manufacturers during the First World War, being responsible for the design and manufacture of large, multi-engine long-range bombers, such as the three-engined Caproni Ca.32, Ca.33, Ca.36 and Ca.40. These aircraft were adopted not only by the Italian military, but by the French as well. Caproni's bombers were a significant contribution in the development of heavy aircraft. Following the end of the conflict, the strategic bombing theories of Giulio Douhet were reputedly shaped by the operational use of Caproni bombers, and thus have been was seen as an important landmark in the history of aviation.

The Interwar period was a busy one for Caproni. While the end of the First World War had led to a rapid decrease in demand for bombers, impacting orders for much of Caproni's traditional product line, Caproni elected to redirect the bulk of the company's resources towards the growing civil aviation market. It was also during this period that the company was reorganised into a large syndicate, which was named the Società Italiana Caproni, Milano, as a result of having acquired several smaller Italian manufacturers. By the 1930s, the company's main subdivisions comprised Caproni Bergamasca, Caproni Vizzola, Reggiane and the engine manufacturer Isotta Fraschini. Caproni's aircraft activity largely orientated towards the production of bombers and light transport aircraft.

Perhaps the most distinctive of Caproni's aircraft was the Caproni Ca.60 Transaereo, an experimental large flying boat designed for the civil sector. At the time, the concept of a large multi-engined flying boat to serve long-distance passenger routes was considered to be radical. However, Caproni believed that such an aircraft could allow the travel to remote areas more quickly than ground or water transport, and that the investment required to develop and manufacturer such an aircraft would be less expensive than pursuing alternative means. During 1919, Caproni filed to patent his work on the concept. His large seaplane design, designated Caproni Ca.60, was highly unorthodox, featuring eight engines and three sets of triple wings. On 12 February or 2 March 1921, the aircraft took off for the first time, proving to be both stable and maneuverable during its brief flight, in spite of a persisting tendency to climb. However, on March 4, the sole completed aircraft was lost while attempting its second flight.

During 1927, the Caproni Museum (Italian: Museo Caproni) was established in Taliedo by Giovanni Caproni and his wife, Timina Caproni. It is both the oldest aviation museum in Italy, as well as the country's oldest corporate museum. The Caproni Museum has long outlived the Caproni company itself.

Caproni continued to maintain its interest in innovative aircraft. One such example was the Stipa-Caproni, also known as the Caproni Stipa, which was designed by  Luigi Stipa and built by Caproni during the early 1930s. The aircraft featured a hollow, barrel-shaped fuselage with the engine and propeller completely enclosed by the fuselage, effectively forming a single ducted fan. While unconventional, flight testing found that the approach induced significant aerodynamic drag, cancelling out much of the gains in engine efficiency and reducing the aircraft's top speed to only . Some authors have claimed that its design had influenced the development of jet propulsion.

During the 1930s, Caproni became involved with the Italian aeronautics engineer Secondo Campini, who was engaged in pioneering research in the then-unexplored field of jet propulsion, having proposed adopting a so-called thermo-jet to power an aircraft. Campini had been issued with an initial contract from the Italian government to develop and manufacture his envisioned engine. During 1934, the Regia Aeronautica (the Italian Air Force) granted its approval to proceed with the production of a pair of jet-powered prototype aircraft; Caproni was engaged to manufacture this aircraft, which was thus designated as the Caproni Campini N.1, with Campini providing technical guidance while specialising in the engine's design.

On 27 August 1940, the maiden flight of the experimental N.1 occurred at Caproni's Taliedo facility. On 30 November 1941, the second prototype was flown from Milan's Linate Airport to Rome's Guidonia Airport, in a highly publicised event that included a fly-past over Rome and a reception with Italian Prime Minister Benito Mussolini. According to the historian Nathanial Edwards, the practicality of the N.1 design had been undermined by political pressure to speed the programme along so that Italy would be more likely to be the first country in the world to perform a jet-powered flight. According to economics author Harrison Mark, Soviet aircraft design bureau TsAGI obtained details on the N.1 programme and were encouraged to pursue work on a similar design; as such, there is a basis for stating that the design of the N.1 influenced subsequent early jet aircraft.

The early years of the postwar era was one of considerable hardship for Caproni and the wider Italian aviation industry alike. During 1950, the Società Italiana Caproni ceased to exist. However, one of the company's former divisions, Caproni Vizzola, endured until 1983, at which point it was acquired by the Italian helicopter manufacturer Agusta.

Aircraft
From

Pre-World War I
 Caproni Ca.1 of 1910 – Experimental biplane

World War I
 Caproni Ca.1 of 1914 – Heavy bomber
 Caproni Ca.2 – Heavy bomber
 Caproni Ca.3 – Heavy bomber
 Caproni Ca.4 – Heavy bomber
 Caproni Ca.5 – Heavy bomber
 Caproni Ca.14 - biplane
 Caproni Ca.15 - monoplane
 Caproni Ca.17 - monoplane
 Caproni Ca.18  – Observation plane
 Caproni Ca.19 - monoplane
 Caproni Ca.20 – Monoplane fighter
 Caproni Ca.21 - reconnaissance aircraft
 Caproni Ca.22 – Variable incidence research parasol monoplane 
 Caproni Ca.26 - project
 Caproni Ca.27 - project
 Caproni Ca.28 - project
 Caproni Ca.29 - project
 Caproni Ca.31 – Modified Ca.1
 Caproni Ca.32 – Modified Italian Army version of Ca.1

Inter-war period
 Caproni Ca.30 – Postwar redesignation of 1914 Ca.1
 Caproni Ca.33 – Postwar redesignation of Ca.3
 Caproni Ca.34 – Postwar redesignation of proposed modified Ca.3
 Caproni Ca.35 – Postwar redesignation of proposed modified Ca.3
 Caproni Ca.36 – Postwar redesignation of modified Ca.3
 Caproni Ca.37 – Postwar redesignation of prototype ground-attack version of Ca.3
 Caproni Ca.39 – Postwar redesignation of proposed seaplane version of Ca.3
 Caproni Ca.40 – Postwar redesignation of Ca.4 prototype
 Caproni Ca.41 – Postwar redesignation of Ca.4 variant
 Caproni Ca.42 – Postwar redesignation of Ca.4 variant
 Caproni Ca.43 – Postwar redesignation of floatplane variant of Ca.4
 Caproni Ca.44 – Postwar redesignation of Ca.5 heavy bomber
 Caproni Ca.45 – Postwar redesignation of Ca.5 aircraft built for France
 Caproni Ca.46 – Postwar redesignation of Ca.5 variant
 Caproni Ca.47 – Postwar redesignation of seaplane version of Ca.5
 Caproni Ca.48 – Airliner version of Ca.4
 Caproni Ca.49 – Proposed seaplane airliner of 1919
 Caproni Ca.50 – Air ambulance version of Ca.44
 Caproni Ca.51 – Postwar redesignation of prototype of enlarged Ca.4
 Caproni Ca.52 – Postwar redesignation for Ca.4 aircraft built for Royal Naval Air Service
 Caproni Ca.56 – Airliner version of Ca.1
 Caproni Ca.57 – Airliner version of Ca.44
 Caproni Ca.58 – Postwar redesignation for re-engined Ca.4s
 Caproni Ca.59 – Postwar redesignation for exported Ca.58s
 Caproni Ca.60 Noviplano – Flying boat airliner prototype
 Caproni Ca.64 - fighter project
 Caproni Ca.65 - fighter project 
 Caproni Ca.66 - Four-engine, single-fuselage bomber of 1922
 Caproni Ca.68 - reconnaissance flying boat project 
 Caproni Ca.69 - reconnaissance flying boat project
 Caproni Ca.70 – Prototype night fighter of 1925
 Caproni Ca.71 – Ca.70 variant of 1927
 Caproni Ca.73 – Airliner and light bomber
 Caproni Ca.74 – Re-engined Ca.73 light bomber
 Caproni Ca.75 - biplane bomber project
 Caproni Ca.76 - biplane bomber project
 Caproni Ca.77 - biplane bomber project
 Caproni Ca.78 - biplane bomber project
 Caproni Ca.80 – Later redesignation of Ca.74
 Caproni Ca.81 - reconnaissance monoplane project
 Caproni Ca.82 – Redesignation of Ca.73ter variant
 Caproni Ca.83 - monoplane fighter
 Caproni Ca.84 - biplane flying boat project
 Caproni Ca.85 - biplane flying boat project
 Caproni Ca.86 - biplane flying boat project
 Caproni Ca.88 – Redesignation of Ca.73quarter variant
 Caproni Ca.89 – Redesignation of Ca.73quarterG variant
 Caproni Ca.90 – Heavy bomber aircraft
 Caproni Ca.92 - reconnaissance biplane project
 Caproni Ca.93 - biplane bomber project
 Caproni Ca.94 - 4-engine monoplane heavy bomber
 Caproni Ca.95 - Heavy bomber aircraft, 1933
 Caproni Ca.96 - 4-engine biplane heavy bomber project
 Caproni Ca.97 – Civil utility aircraft
 Caproni Ca.98 - monoplane tourer
 Caproni Ca.99 - biplane tourer
 Caproni Ca.100 – Trainer
 Caproni Ca.101 – Airliner, transport, and bomber
 Caproni Ca.102 – Re-engined Ca.101
 Caproni Ca.106 - civil biplane project
 Caproni Ca.107 - biplane fighter project
 Caproni Ca.108 - mailplane project
 Caproni Ca.109 - 2-seat biplane sport/trainer
 Caproni Ca.110 - biplane fighter project
 Caproni Ca.111 – Reconnaissance aircraft and light bomber
 Caproni Ca.113 – Advanced trainer
 Caproni Ca.114 – Biplane fighter
 Caproni Ca.115 - twin-engined sesquiplane bomber project
 Caproni Ca.116 - sports biplane project
 Caproni Ca.117 - experimental high-altitude monoplane project
 Caproni Ca.118 - twin-engine monoplane bomber project
 Caproni Ca.119 - reconnaissance biplane project
 Caproni Ca.121 - fast monoplane bomber project
 Caproni Ca.122 – Prototype bomber and transport
 Caproni Ca.123 – Proposed airliner version of Ca.122
 Caproni Ca.124 – Reconnaissance and bomber floatplane
 Caproni Ca.125 – Two-seat touring biplane
 Caproni Ca.126 - monoplane sports aircraft project
 Caproni Ca.128 - low-wing metal monoplane 1+4 feederliner project 
 Caproni Ca.129 - low-wing metal monoplane 1+4 feederliner project
 Caproni Ca.130 - trimotor transport, precursor of Caproni Ca.133
 Caproni Ca.132 – Prototype bomber and airliner
 Caproni Ca.134 – Reconnaissance biplane
 Caproni Ca.150 - twin-boom attack fighter
 Caproni Ca.153 - monoplane heavy fighter project
 Caproni Ca.154 - twin-engine monoplane heavy fighter project
 Caproni Ca.155 - twin-engine monoplane heavy fighter project
 Caproni Ca.156 - twin-engined heavy fighter project
 Caproni Ca.161 – High-altitude experimental aircraft
 Caproni Ca.162 - recce-fighter project
 Caproni Ca.163 – Prototype of Ca.164
 Caproni Ca.165 – Prototype fighter of 1938
 Caproni Ca.204 - long-range bomber project
 Caproni Ca.211 - three-engine long-range bomber project
 Caproni Ca.201 - high altitude bomber project
 Caproni Ca.205 - long-range bomber project
 Caproni Ca.214 - aerobatic trainer project
 Caproni Ca.301 – Prototype fighter
 Caproni A.P.1 – Attack aircraft derivative of Ca.301
 Caproni Ca.305 – First production version of A.P.1
 Caproni Ca.306 – Airliner prototype (1935)
 Caproni Ca.307 – Second production version of A.P.1
 Caproni Ca.308 – Export version of A.P.1 for El Salvador and Paraguay
 Caproni Ca. 308 Borea – Airliner
 Caproni Ca.309 – military light twin
 Caproni Ca.345 – recce floatplane project
 Caproni Ca.350 – Fighter-bomber, reconnaissance aircraft
 Caproni-Reggiane Ca.400 – Caproni-Reggiane-built version of Piaggio P.32 medium bomber
 Caproni Ca.401 – twin-engine recce-fighter
 Caproni Ca.405 – Caproni-built version of Piaggio P.32 medium bomber
 Caproni Ca.410 – twin-engined recce-bomber floatplane project
 Caproni CH.1 – Prototype fighter of 1935
 Caproni PS.1 – Sports aircraft
 Caproni Bergamaschi PL.3 – Long-distance racer aircraft
 Caproni-Pensuti triplane – Sports triplane of 1919
 Caproni Sauro-1 – Two-seat touring aircraft
 Caproni Vizzola F.5 – Fighter of 1939
 Stipa-Caproni – Experimental ducted-fan powered prototype of 1932

World War II
 Caproni Ca.133 – Transport and bomber
 Caproni Ca.135 – Medium bomber
 Caproni Ca.148 – Civil-military transport version of Ca.133
 Caproni Ca.164 – Trainer and liaison and reconnaissance aircraft
 Caproni Ca.309 Ghibli – Reconnaissance, ground-attack, and transport aircraft
 Caproni Ca.310 Libeccio – Reconnaissance aircraft and light bomber
 Caproni Ca.311 – Light bomber and reconnaissance aircraft
 Caproni Ca.312 – Re-engined version of Ca.310 sold to Norway
 Caproni Ca.313 – Reconnaissance bomber, trainer, and transport
 Caproni Ca.314 – Ground-attack aircraft and torpedo bomber
 Caproni Ca.316 – Seaplane
 Caproni Ca.320 - three-engine bomber
 Caproni Ca.325 – Proposed version of Ca.135 medium bomber with more powerful engines, built in mock-up form only
 Caproni Ca.330 - Project
 Caproni Ca.331 – Prototype tactical reconnaissance aircraft/light bomber (Ca.331 O.A./Ca.331A) of 1940 and prototype night fighter (Ca.331 C.N./Ca.331B) of 1942
 Caproni Ca.332 - Project; derived from Ca.330
 Caproni Ca.335 – Fighter-bomber, reconnaissance aircraft for the Belgian Air Force.
 Caproni Ca.360 - Twin engine dive bomber project
 Caproni Ca.365 - Twin engine bomber project
 Caproni Ca.370 - twin engine combat plane project
 Caproni Ca.375 - twin engine combat plane project
 Caproni Ca.380 - twin-boom fighter project
 Caproni Ca.381 - twin-boom fighter project
 Caproni Campini N.1 – Experimental motorjet-powered aircraft of 1940
 Caproni Campini Ca.183bis – Proposed high-altitude fighter aircraft
 Caproni Vizzola F.4 – Fighter prototype of 1940 with German-made engine
 Caproni Vizzola F.5bis – Proposed version of F.4 with Italian-made engine
 Caproni Vizzola F.6 – Fighter prototype of 1941 (F.6M) and 1943 (F.6Z)

Post-World War II
 Caproni Ca.193 – Twin-engined six-seat monoplane
 Caproni Ca.195 - jet trainer project
 Caproni Trento F-5 – Lightweight two-seat jet trainer
 Caproni Vizzola Calif – Family of gliders (sailplanes) (A-10, A-12, A-14, A-15, A-20, A-21)
 Caproni Vizzola C22 Ventura – Light jet trainer

See also

 Compagnia Nazionale Aeronautica
 Gianni Caproni Museum of Aeronautics
 Isotta Fraschini
 Reggiane

References

Notes

Citations

Bibliography

 
 
 
 Golly, John. Jet: Frank Whittle and the Invention of the Jet Engine. Datum Publishing, 1996. .
 
 Mark, Harrison. The Economics Of Coercion And Conflict. World Scientific, 2014. .
 
 Pavelec, Sterling Michael. The jet race and the Second World War. Praeger Security International: Westport, Connecticut. 2007. .

External links

 
Defunct aircraft manufacturers of Italy
Manufacturing companies based in Milan
Companies based in Reggio Emilia
Conglomerate companies of Italy
Companies based in Lombardy
Companies based in Trentino-Alto Adige/Südtirol
Vehicle manufacturing companies established in 1908
Vehicle manufacturing companies disestablished in 1950
Italian companies established in 1908
1950 disestablishments in Italy
Agusta
Italian brands